Chenommet is a former commune in the Charente department in southwestern France. On 1 January 2017, it was merged into the new commune Aunac-sur-Charente.

Population

See also
Communes of the Charente department

References

Former communes of Charente